Thunder of the Gods is an album by Sun Ra and His Arkestra featuring unreleased live and studio recordings which was issued in April 2017 on the Modern Harmonic label.

Reception

Metacritic assigned album an aggregate score of 77 out of 100 based on 5 critical reviews. The Allmusic review awarded the album 3½ stars out of 5, stating "The first side is a 23-minute portion of a performance at Slug's Saloon in New York, where the Arkestra held an 18-month weekly residence. ... The other two selections on the disc are mono studio recordings taken from the same period as the Strange Strings album, so named because Ra provided the musicians with stringed instruments that they were unfamiliar with. He instructed them to start playing, but not how or what to play. As such, it's some of the most challenging music produced by the Arkestra, filled with atonal scraping, clawing, scratching, clattering, and slapping. Fascinating stuff for hardcore fans, but for most other listeners, the first half of the album is more likely to be played more than once". Pitchfork gave the album 8 out of 10, saying, "This new set of unheard songs is gripping and challenging, as to be expected from the free jazz legend. Using oddball orchestrations, Sun Ra unfurls more complexities of the astral realm". The PopMatters site stated "This is not music for the faint of heart or the impatient of ear, this is bold and strange and difficult, but like secondhand reports of undiscovered countries, it is impossible to comprehend what is being communicated without following to see and experience this strangeness for yourself".

Track listing
All compositions by Sun Ra

 "Calling Planet Earth – We'll Wait for You" – 23:34
 "Moonshots Across the Sky" – 5:44
 "Thunder of the Gods" – 13:23

Personnel
Sun Ra – Moog, Intergalactic space organ, Lightning drum, strings
Marshall Allen – alto saxophone, oboe, piccolo flute, strings
Ronnie Boykins – bass, viola, dutar
Robert Cummings – strings
Danny Davis – alto saxophone, clarinet, strings
Akh Tal Ebar, Kwami Hadi – trumpet (track 1)
John Gilmore – tenor saxophone, strings
Ali Hassan – trombone, strings
Lex Humphries – drums (track 1)
James Jacson – oboe, flute, log drums, strings
Clifford Jarvis – percussion
Art Jenkins, Carl Nimrod – strings
Eloe Omoe – bass clarinet, strings
Pat Patrick – baritone saxophone, strings
Danny Ray Thompson – baritone saxophone, flute (track 1)
Charles Stevens – trombone (track 1)
June Tyson – vocals (track 1)
Alzo Wright – cello (track 1)

References

2017 albums
Sun Ra albums